Uncobotyodes is a genus of moths of the family Crambidae. It contains only one species, Uncobotyodes patulalis, is found in India (Darjeeling).

References

Natural History Museum Lepidoptera genus database

Pyraustinae
Crambidae genera
Monotypic moth genera